The Partnership for Food Safety Education is a nonprofit organization with a mission to end illness and death from foodborne infections in the United States. The Partnership uses science-based resources to reach consumers in the US. It is composed of individuals from the food industry, professional societies in food science, nutrition and health consumer groups, the United States Department of Agriculture, the Centers for Disease Control and Prevention, and the Food and Drug Administration.
They serve health and food safety educators nationwide, who refer to themselves as "BAC! Fighters".

History

The Partnership for Food Safety Education (PFSE) was established in the United States in 1994 with the goal of reducing the incidence of foodborne illness by educating consumers about safe food handling and preparation practices. PFSE is a non-profit organization that brings together government agencies, industry associations, and academic institutions to promote food safety education to the general public through its "Fight BAC!" campaign. The "Fight BAC!" campaign provides consumers with simple and easy-to-follow recommendations for safe food handling, such as washing hands frequently, cooking meat to proper temperatures, and refrigerating food promptly.

Original government signatories to the MOU included the Secretaries of Health and Human Services, Agriculture, and Education with responsibilities of the parties as follows:The Partnership for Food Safety Education and FDA, CDC, FSIS, CSREES, and ED will work together to develop one overarching theme or slogan akin to "Five a Day" or "Only You Can Prevent Forest Fires." Key educational messages will be channeled through existing networks of each signee and the outlets such as the media; local, state and federal governments; public health offices; consumer-based organizations; and private sector businesses.The IRS in 2003 issued a determination letter of the Partnership for Food Safety Education as a nonprofit, 501(c)(3) organization.

In 2010, the Partnership for Food Safety Education underwent an institutional strategic analysis that identified three focus areas for the Partnership. The Partnership supports consumer food safety education in three ways: convening, amplifying, and evaluation.

Fight BAC! Campaign 
The Partnership for Food Safety Education is the creator of the Fight BAC! campaign. The campaign was created in 1997 as a joint effort between industry and federal government agencies to reach the public on consumer food safety education. Sixteen focus groups in six cities were conducted in the development process of the campaign.

References

External links 

 Official website

Food safety organizations
Non-profit organizations based in Arlington, Virginia
501(c)(3) organizations